The Complete Crumb Comics is a series of collections from Fantagraphics Books which was intended to reproduce the entire body of American cartoonist and comic book artist/writer Robert Crumb's comics work in chronological order, beginning with his fanzine work from as early as 1958.

While the series was intended to be complete, there is some material missing (most notably The Yum Yum Book, the copyright of which is owned by Crumb's ex-wife Dana, but which has otherwise been in print as Big Yum Yum Book: The Story of Oggie and the Beanstalk).

Its publication is considered to have brought more serious attention to Crumb's oeuvre, and was one of the earliest attempts to collect a cartoonist's full body of work. The series lasted 17 volumes and was published up until 2005 (covering Crumb's work up to 1992). After this, Crumb's work was to be collected in individually titled collections, and not be part of the official numbered series.

Volumes
All volumes have been published at some point in both softcover and hardcover editions. Two box sets have also been produced, collected Volumes #1–5 and #6–10, with a slip case and signed plate, limited to 400 sets each.

Vol #1 had a revised edition in 2011 to include an additional 66 pages, mostly consisting of the reprint of Arcade #22 (1962). Even with the expansion of this first volume, it failed to additionally include some of the rarest earliest strips, such as Perry Messin, a 4.5 page MAD comics style parody of the Perry Mason TV show, only found in the fanzine EChhhh! #3 (Ken Winter publ., 1959)

Vol #6 also had a revised edition that appeared in 1997, with an additional 12 pages of material, and the removal of one image that involved Robert Williams.

The first two volumes contain material going back as far as Crumb's teenage years, from before he had had his comics professionally published. Some consider this material to be non-essential, and that it would be better for a newcomer to start with later volumes.

Awards

Notes

References

External links
 Series product page at Fantagraphics Books' website
 

Fantagraphics titles
American comics
Autobiographical comics
Underground comix
Comic book collection books
1987 comics debuts
Comics by Robert Crumb
Eisner Award winners
Harvey Award winners